Karl Herxheimer (26 June 1861 – 6 December 1942) was a German-Jewish dermatologist who was a native of Wiesbaden. 

He studied medicine at the universities of Freiburg, Strasbourg and Würzburg, receiving his doctorate in 1885 with a thesis on cerebral syphilis. Following graduation he worked as an assistant to Karl Weigert at the Institute of Pathology in Frankfurt am Main, and to Albert Neisser at the university skin clinic in Breslau.

He later worked with his older brother, Salomon Herxheimer (1841–1899) in Frankfurt, where in 1894, he became director of the municipal dermatology clinic. Along with Paul Ehrlich, he was instrumental in founding the University of Frankfurt. In 1914 he became a professor for skin and venereal diseases at the new university. In August 1942, at the age of 81, he was taken to the Theresienstadt concentration camp, where he died a few months later.

Herxheimer is credited with providing an early description of acrodermatitis chronica atrophicans (Taylor's disease), which is a dermatological disorder associated with the later stages of Lyme disease. This condition is sometimes referred to as "Pick–Herxheimer disease", named along with co-discoverer Philipp Josef Pick (1834–1910). With Austrian dermatologist Adolf Jarisch (1850–1902), the Jarisch-Herxheimer reaction ("herxing") is named, which is an inflammatory reaction to Salvarsan, antibiotics or mercury, when using these agents to treat syphilis.

The clinical pharmacologist Andrew Herxheimer was his great nephew.

Published works 
 Über acrodermatitis chronica atrophicans. Archiv für Dermatologie und Syphilis, Berlin, 1902, 61: 57-76.
 Ueber eine bei Syphilitischen vorkommende Quecksilberreaktion. Deutsche medizinische Wochenschrift, 1902, Berlin, 1902, 28: 895-897.

References
 Karl Herxheimer @ Who Named It

1861 births
1942 deaths
Scientists from Wiesbaden
People from the Duchy of Nassau
19th-century German Jews
German dermatologists
University of Würzburg alumni
University of Freiburg alumni
University of Strasbourg alumni
Academic staff of Goethe University Frankfurt
German people who died in the Theresienstadt Ghetto
Jewish scientists
Lyme disease researchers